Al Qusais or Al Gusais is a large community in Dubai, United Arab Emirates (UAE).  It is located in the Deira area of east Dubai.  Al Qusais borders the localities of Hor Al Anz and Al Twar and is further subdivided into residential (Al Qusais) and industrial (Al Qusais Industrial Area) localities.

Neighborhoods
Al Qusais residential areas are subdivided into:
 Al Qusais First
 Al Qusais Second
 Al Qusais Third

The industrial areas are subdivided into:
 Al Qusais Industrial Area First
 Al Qusais Industrial Area Second
 Al Qusais Industrial Area Third
 Al Qusais Industrial Area Fourth
 Al Qusais Industrial Area Fifth

The industrial areas lead into the industrial areas of the emirate of Dubai.

Education

Education in Al Qusais is provided by a number of public and privates schools and colleges. There are Arabic, Australian, British, American and Indian schools. There are also various private institutes providing dance, music, art and computer lessons. Educational institutions situated in Al-Qusais include:
 Crescent English High School
 Dubai Scholars Private School
 Star International School
 The Westminster School
 Sheikh Rashid Al Maktoum Pakistani School 
 Adab Iranian Private School
 Pristine Private School
 Dubai Women's College
 Emcan Educational Institute, Al Nahda 2
 Oscar Educational Institute
 Kairali Kala Kendram
 Jmaia Sadiya Arabiya Indian Centre Al Qusais 1
 Future Target Institute , Al Nahda 2

Transportation

The Green line (one of the two lines on the Dubai Metro network) 
has five of its stations situated in Al Qusais. The 'Etisalat' depot station has a parking area which can house 60 trains. Al Qusais Station, Airport Free Zone, Al Nahda and Stadium are the other metro stations. Terminal 2 of Dubai International Airport is two minutes drive from the Airport Free Zone metro station. Al Qusais also has an extensive bus service and taxi services.

Facilities

Shopping

Al Qusais houses several small and large supermarkets and department stores.

Al Mulla plaza is the first large shopping centre in Al Qusais and one of the oldest shopping centre in Dubai. It is an important landmark in the city. The Dubai Police Museum is located at Al Mulla Plaza which opened on November 19, 1987. It comprises three exhibit halls, as well as documenting anti-drug efforts of the police force, and the force's prison systems. On November 19, 1987, the International Council of Museums placed the museum on the record of Arab Museums.[8]

Medical Centres
There are several medical centres in Al Qusais.

Zulekha Hospital
The various department of the hospital provides the service of General Practitioners and also Emergency along with Cardiology, Dental, Dermatology, E.N.T, Endocrinology, Gastroenterology, Gynaecology, Internal Medicine, Laparoscopy, Nutrition & Lifestyle, Management, Neurology, Neonatology, Nephrology, Ophthalmology, Orthodontics, Orthopedics, Paediatrics, Plastic & Reconstruction Surgery, Psychiatry, Physiotherapy, Surgery, Urology, Ambulance Service, Emergency Room, I.C.U, Laboratory, Operation Theatre, Pharmacy and Radiology.

NMC
Located in the Amman Street and open 24 hours, this 100-bed hospital incorporates facilities including diagnostic equipment like the Heart Mapping System, Multi Slice CT Scan, MRI and the Cardiac Catheterization Laboratory which is equipped with a digital imaging system and a three-dimensional cardiac arrhythmias mapping system (the first of its kind to be installed in Dubai), which enables the mapping and ablation of rhythm disorders of the heart. In addition, the Physical Medicine & Rehabilitation Department brings for the first time in the region, help to people for regaining the most independent level of functioning after severe injury, trauma, and illness. The Sleep Lab, which analyses sleep related problems is also one of the first facilities in the region.

Aster Medical Centre, Welcare EDC Al Qusais clinic, Al Deyafa Medical centre, Joseph's Clinic, Mini VM polyclinic also provide medical care in the community.

Government Organisations

Dubai Police General Headquarters is located opposite Al Mulla Plaza. Al Qusais police station is one of the ten police stations in Dubai and was founded in 1977. It moved to new premises, Beirut Street in 1999. The Ministry of Education, Ministry of Labour, Dubai Civil Defence Headquarters is also located in the community.

Business Center
Ali Saif Al Mansoori Business Center, Moopans Group Located next to Al Twar centre. Ali Saif Al Mansoori Business Center has 100+ Fully Furnished Offices. This is the biggest business community in Al Qusais.

Sports and Recreation

Al Ahli club was established in 1970, when two local football teams Al Wehdah and Al Shabab (est. 1962) joined, and then four years later another local team Al Najah joined to form Al Ahli Club. It is located next to the Stadium metro station. The club competes in basketball, volleyball, handball, track sport, table tennis and track cycling.

The community has two public parks.
 Al Qusais 1 park is situated near the Masjid Al Ansar mosque with a basketball court and extensive play area for children. 
 Al Qusais 2 park is situated behind Damascus Street near Elite Classic Hotel.

Hotels

fortune Grand Hotel, fortune  Classic, Fortune Plaza (previously known as the Princess Hotel), Fortune Classic Hotel Apartments, Al Bustan Hotel, Emirates Star Hotel Apartments, Layia Plaza Hotel and Tulip Inn Hotel Apartments are some of the hotels situated in Al Qusais.

Communities in Dubai